Frank Hughes College, now Frank Hughes School began as a consolidated private educational institution in Clifton, Tennessee in September 1905.  It is currently part of the Wayne County School system.

History
Frank Hughes College was established in memory of a young boy who was killed in a hunting accident in 1904.  The school began as a grade school, secondary school, and a college, all in one facility.  By 1909, there were students from several states attending the college and boarding at private homes in the town.  The college portion was phased out in the late 1920s after steamboat travel began to change to automobiles.   The original building was demolished in 1976.

Athletics
In 1986, the FHS girls basketball team had a 35–3 win/loss record and won the class A State championship.

References

External links
Official website

Private high schools in Tennessee
Schools in Wayne County, Tennessee
Private middle schools in Tennessee
Private elementary schools in Tennessee